Al Seef or Al Seef Khor is a 1.8 km waterfront promenade along the bank of Dubai Creek in the Al Fahidi neighborhood of Dubai, United Arab Emirates.

History 
The promenade was developed by Dubai-based real estate company Meraas and its construction was completed in 2017.

Reception 
Cristiano Luchetti, an associate professor at the American University of Ras Al Khaimah, called this project a "historical fraud" based on a critical interpretation of the usage of components taken from the features of the local architecture of Dubai without sufficient interpretative key and the use of artificially aged finishes and materials.

Similar sentiments are shared by other academicians as the project completely undermines the municipal and cultural authorities' work in preservation and rehabilitation. Moreover, the Al Seef buildings, are an inflated and inaccurate interpretation of the old wind tower houses in Dubai, built of modern materials and aged theatrically to indicate hardship that is not even visible in the initially maintained homes.

Gallery

References 

Waterfronts
Architecture in Dubai
Architectural controversies